NSW Fair Trading is a division of the New South Wales State Government's Department of Customer Service in Australia. The division's focus is to create a fair, safe and equitable marketplace in New South Wales. It investigates allegations of unfair business practices, and regulates goods sold in New South Wales. It also performs the administrative functions of registering business cooperatives and associations, and issuing occupational licenses. 
Fair Trading’s customer service is managed by Service NSW, which acts as first point of contact for all Fair Trading enquiries.

References

External links 
 http://www.fairtrading.nsw.gov.au/

Fair trading
Business in Australia
Economy of New South Wales